Arthur Rowley (9 May 1933 – 18 February 2014) was an English footballer who played as a striker.

References

External links
 LFC History profile
 

1933 births
English footballers
Liverpool F.C. players
Wrexham A.F.C. players
Crewe Alexandra F.C. players
2014 deaths
Association football inside forwards
Burscough F.C. players
Chorley F.C. players
English Football League players
People from Fazakerley